Umm Suqiem is a locality in Dubai, United Arab Emirates (UAE).  Umm Suqiem is located in western Dubai, along the Jumeirah Beach coastline.  It is bordered to the north by Jumeirah, to the south by Al Sufouh, and to the west by Al Safa, Al Manara and Umm Al Sheif.

Umm Suqiem comprises three sub-communities - — Umm Suqiem 1, Umm Suqiem 2 and Umm Suqiem 3 — which house affluent residential communities and tourist attractions. Umm Al Sheif Road separates Umm Suqiem from Jumeirah while routing D 65 (Al Manara Road) separates Umm Suqiem 1 from Umm Suqiem 2 and Al Thanya Road separates Umm Suqiem 2 from Umm Suqiem 3. Al Thanya Road is the most important road in all of Umm Suqeim because of the residents that live on it.

Several important tourist attractions and commercial centers are located in Umm Suqiem.  Emirates International School, Suqiem Public Park and Same Day Dental Clinic are located in Umm Suqeim 2, while Jumeirah Beach Hotel, Burj Al Arab and Wild Wadi Water Park is located in Umm Suqiem 3, along the sub-community Jumeirah Beach coast. Schools in the area include Emirates International School – Jumeirah, and King's Dubai  School, a private primary school with around 900 students enrolled.

References 

Communities in Dubai